Pucasaya (possibly from Quechua puka red, saya slope, "red slope") is a  mountain in the Andes of Peru. It is situated southeast of the salt lake named Salinas. The mountain is located in the Moquegua Region, General Sánchez Cerro Province, Matalaque District, southwest of the active Ubinas volcano. Pucasaya lies on the southern border of the buffer zone of the Salinas and Aguada Blanca National Reservation.

See also 
 Pachakutiq
 Qillqata

References

Mountains of Peru
Mountains of Moquegua Region